The 2020 Croatian Cup Final between Rijeka and Lokomotiva was played on 1 August 2020 in Šibenik.

Road to the final

Match details

Notes

References

External links 
Official website 

2020 Final
HNK Rijeka matches
Cup Final
Croatian Football Cup Final
Croatian Football Cup Final